Pir Sara (also Romanized as Pīr Sarā; also known as Pursre) is a village in Gurab Zarmikh Rural District, Mirza Kuchek Janghli District, Sowme'eh Sara County, Gilan Province, Iran. At the 2006 census, its population was 634, in 167 families.

References 

Populated places in Sowme'eh Sara County